Bjørn Gjevik (born 30 March 1939) is a Norwegian physicist.

He hails from Hitra. He took the dr.philos. degree in 1972 and became a professor of hydrodynamics at the University of Oslo in 1977. He is a fellow of the Norwegian Academy of Science and Letters.

He resides at Grav.

References

1939 births
Living people
People from Hitra
Academic staff of the University of Oslo
Norwegian physicists
Members of the Norwegian Academy of Science and Letters